Batu is a parliamentary constituency in the northern outskirts of Kuala Lumpur, Malaysia, covering the area between Sentul and Batu Caves.

Settlements which are part of Batu constituency include Sentul. The constituency has the most Projek Perumahan Rakyat (PPR) public housing apartments and one of the highest rates of petty crime in the city.

Transportation 
The Batu suburb is currently served by the  Taman Wahyu,  Kampung Batu and  Batu Kentonmen Komuter stations on the KTM Komuter  Seremban Line.

It is also served by the  Kampung Batu MRT station on the  MRT Putrajaya Line. In the future, the  Kentonmen as well as the  Jalan Ipoh stations will serve the suburb as part of Phase 2 for the remaining line.

Politics 
The current Member of Parliament (MP) for the Batu parliamentary constituency is Prabakaran Parameswaran from Pakatan Harapan of PKR, who won the seat in the 2018 Malaysian general election. He is also the youngest serving MP in Malaysia.

See also 

 Jalan Ipoh

References

Suburbs in Kuala Lumpur